The 2022 Tour des Alpes-Maritimes et du Var was a road cycling stage race that took place between 18 and 20 February 2022 in the departments of Alpes-Maritimes and Var in southeastern France. The race was rated as a category 2.1 event on the 2022 UCI Europe Tour calendar, and was the 54th edition of the Tour des Alpes-Maritimes et du Var.

Teams 
Seven of the 18 UCI WorldTeams, six UCI ProTeams, and three UCI Continental teams made up the 18 teams that participated in the race. 11 teams entered a full squad of seven riders each, and six teams entered six riders each, while  was the only team to enter five riders. There was one non-starter, which reduced  to six riders, so a total of 117 riders started the race. Of these riders, 96 finished.

UCI WorldTeams

 
 
 
 
 
 
 

UCI ProTeams

 
 
 
 
 
 

UCI Continental Teams

Route

Stages

Stage 1 
18 February 2022 – Saint-Raphaël to La Seyne-sur-Mer,

Stage 2 
19 February 2022 – Puget-Théniers to La Turbie,

Stage 3 
20 February 2022 – Villefranche-sur-Mer to Blausasc,

Classification leadership table 

 On stage 2, Anthony Turgis, who was second in the points classification, wore the green jersey, because first-placed Caleb Ewan wore the yellow jersey as the leader of the general classification. On stage 3, Ewan wore the green jersey in place of Tim Wellens, who took over the lead in both classifications.

Final classification standings

General classification

Points classification

Mountains classification

Young rider classification

Team classification

References

Sources

External links 
 

2022
Tour des Alpes-Maritimes et du Var
Tour des Alpes-Maritimes et du Var
Tour des Alpes-Maritimes et du Var